Darus Suharto (born 1968) is a poker player born in Sumenep, Indonesia and currently residing in Toronto, Ontario, Canada, where he works as a Certified General Accountant at York University, and is a member of the Certified General Accountants of Ontario. Suharto finished 6th in the 2008 World Series of Poker Main Event, for which he earned $2,418,562. He had previously cashed in the Main Event in 2006, where he finished in 448th place. His three cashes at the WSOP have netted him $2,449,269, which accounts for the majority of his lifetime tournament winnings.

References

External links
 Bluff Magazine Player Profile
 Tournament results from The Hendon Mob

1968 births
Living people
Canadian poker players
Canadian people of Indonesian descent
Indonesian poker players
Sportspeople from Toronto